Achatina (Tripachatina) vignoniana is a species of air-breathing land snail, a terrestrial pulmonate gastropod mollusk in the family Achatinidae, the giant African snails.

Distribution
This species is endemic to Gabon.

References

 Morelet, A. (1874). Description d'un Achatina nouveau du Gabon. Journal de conchyliologie. 22(4): 372. page(s): 372

Invertebrates of Gabon
Achatinidae
Endemic fauna of Gabon
Gastropods described in 1874
Taxonomy articles created by Polbot